Just Another Band from the Cosmic Inferno is an album by the band Acid Mothers Temple & The Cosmic Inferno.

Track listing

Personnel
 Tabata Mitsuru : bass, vocals, maratab
 Higashi Hiroshi : electronics, dancin' king
 Shimura Koji : drums, Latino cool
 Okano Futoshi : drums, god speed
 Kawabata Makoto : guitars, speed guru

produced & engineered by Kawabata Makoto

Guests
 Tiffany : erotic whisper

References

External links
 Acid Mothers Temple & The Cosmic Inferno "Just Another Band From The Cosmic Inferno at acidmothers.com

2005 albums
Acid Mothers Temple albums
Important Records albums